Thomas Kato Vittrup, better known as Kato (born 13 September 1981), is a Danish disc jockey and music producer mostly in the house genre.

Musical career
Kato started DJing at nightclubs in 2005 remixing for other artists and independently since 2008, at which time he also started writing and producing his own music. His breakthrough came with the commercial success of the single "Turn the Lights Off", released on 1 January 2010, receiving platinum status for selling 30,000 copies in early August 2010. The track, is a cover version of an earlier hit by DJ Jose from 2007. The track contains the vocals of Jon (full name Jon Nørgaard), a Danish Popstars contestant.

Kato released his first album, Discolized, on 1 March 2010 on the Danish label disco:wax that includes collaborations with Jon (Jon Nørgaard), Outlandish, Dr. Alban, Terri B, U$O and Johnson (Marc Johnson). The album reached #6 on the official Danish Albums Chart.

The second single from the album, "Hey Shorty (Yeah Yeah Pt. II)", featuring rappers U$O and Johnson was released on 26 April. It was a big hit for Kato reaching #2 on Tracklisten, the official Danish Singles Chart. It sold above 30,000 copies. The album's third single, "Desert Walk", a collaboration with rap group Outlandish sold 15,000 copies making it to #4.

On 15 July 2010 it was announced that Kato has signed a contract with Universal Music in Germany including possible release of singles and albums in Germany and promotional appearances on German TV.

On 27 December Kato released the single "Sjus" featuring Ida Corr, Camille Jones and Johnson. It is a precursor to Kato's second album Discolized 2.0 due to be released in Spring 2011.

Kato won in 2007 and 2009 award for "Best Danish mainstream DJ" at the Danish DeeJay Awards.

In 2017, he released the song "Show You Love" with Sigala and Hailee Steinfeld.

Discography

Albums

Singles

As lead artist

As featured artist

As Vittrup

Cultural influence 

Kato was the main inspiration for the POPDRENGENE hit "Bawler Ligesom Kato", and has been reported as being the inventor of the dab.

References

External links

1981 births
Living people
German DJs
German record producers
People from Thisted
Danish DJs
Electronic dance music DJs